Trent Bridge Cricket Ground is a cricket ground mostly used for Test, One-Day International and county cricket located in West Bridgford, Nottinghamshire, England, just across the River Trent from the city of Nottingham. Trent Bridge is also the headquarters of Nottinghamshire County Cricket Club. As well as international cricket and Nottinghamshire's home games, the ground has hosted the Finals Day of the Twenty20 Cup twice and will host the final of the One-Day Cup between 2020 and 2024.

In 2009, the ground was used for the ICC World Twenty20 and hosted the semi-final between South Africa and Pakistan. The site takes its name from the nearby main bridge over the Trent and it is also close to Meadow Lane and the City Ground, the football stadiums of Notts County and Nottingham Forest.

History

Trent Bridge was first used as a cricket ground in the 1830s. The first recorded cricket match was held on an area of ground behind the Trent Bridge Inn in 1838. Trent Bridge hosted its first Test match in 1899, with England playing against Australia.

The ground was first opened in 1841 by William Clarke, husband of the proprietress of the Trent Bridge Inn and himself Captain of the All England Cricket Team. He was commemorated in 1990 by the opening of the new William Clarke Stand which incorporates the Rushcliffe Suite. The West Park Sports Ground in West Bridgford was the private ground of Sir Julien Cahn, a furniture millionaire, who often played host to touring national sides.

In 1950, an electronically-operated scoreboard was installed at this venue, then the world's largest at any cricket stadium.

Ground

Trent Bridge is considered to be one of the best grounds in the world to watch cricket.
Trent Bridge's pavilion, kept within the architectural parameters of its 1889 foundation, is thought of as one of the most renowned trademarks of cricket because it faces the wicket at an angle. Recent developments include the £7.2 million Radcliffe Road Cricket Centre, opened in 1998 and the state of the art £1.9 million Fox Road stand, which has received awards for its architectural excellence. The latter includes a modernistic aircraft-wing roof and was opened in 2002 despite a conflict with a small group of local residents over the lack of sunlight that this would cause to their properties.

Commencing in 2007, Trent Bridge has undergone redevelopment with the construction of a new stand to replace the Parr Stand and West Wing and the addition of one to five rows of extra seating at the front of several of the other stands. This increased capacity from 15,358 to 17,500, and the work was completed in time for the 2008 Test match against New Zealand. The stand was officially opened on 5 June by Prince Philip. The stand continued to be officially called the ’New Stand’ for a number of years, also being referred to as the Bridgford Road Stand, before being renamed the Smith Cooper Stand in a sponsorship deal from March 2016.

Bowling takes place from the Pavilion End and the Radcliffe Road End, with the wickets laid square of the Fox Road, William Clarke and Smith Cooper Stands.

Test match records
In Test matches held at the Trent Bridge, the highest team total is 658 for 8 declared, scored by England against Australia in 1938. The lowest team total is 60, scored by Australia against England in 2015, and Stuart Broad also took 8-15 for England against Australia during the same match, in just one innings, as he did not bowl in the second innings. Denis Compton scored 278 against Pakistan in 1954. Sachin Tendulkar also passed the 11,000-run mark in the npower Second Test in 2007. In 2013, Australia's Ashton Agar achieved the highest Test score by a number eleven batsman whilst on debut. Stuart Broad got his 300th test wicket and James Anderson got his 300th home wicket at Trent Bridge. Broad got his during the 8-15 innings, on his first wicket against Chris Rogers. Anderson took his 300th home wicket against South Africa against Dean Elgar on 14 July 2017.

In Tests, the leading run-scorers in this venue are Mike Atherton (1,083 runs), Denis Compton (955 runs) and Graham Gooch (936 runs). The leading wicket-takers are James Anderson (64 wickets), Alec Bedser (41 wickets), and Stuart Broad (40 wickets).

In ODIs, the leading run-scorers here are Eoin Morgan (471 runs), Alex Hales (441 runs), and Jos Buttler (439 runs). The leading wicket-takers are James Anderson (16 wickets), Stuart Broad (14 wickets) and Waqar Younis (12 wickets).

Football

Trent Bridge has a history of hosting football matches. Notts County Football Club played their important games at the ground from the 1860s, and moved there permanently in 1883 when Nottingham Forest left. However, games early and late in the season had to be played elsewhere due to the cricket and Notts County finally left in 1910, moving to Meadow Lane.

Trent Bridge also hosted an international match, England beating Ireland 6–0 on 20 February 1897.

See also

List of cricket grounds in England and Wales
List of Test cricket grounds
List of international cricket centuries at Trent Bridge
List of international cricket five-wicket hauls at Trent Bridge
History of Test cricket (1890 to 1900)

References

External links

Nottinghamshire County Cricket Club

Trent Bridge, Nottingham Cricinfo Travel

Sports venues in Nottingham
West Bridgford
Defunct football venues in England
Cricket grounds in Nottinghamshire
Test cricket grounds in England
Nottingham Forest F.C.
Notts County F.C.
Sports venues completed in 1838
1838 establishments in England
English Football League venues
Nottinghamshire County Cricket Club
1999 Cricket World Cup stadiums
1975 Cricket World Cup stadiums
1979 Cricket World Cup stadiums
1983 Cricket World Cup stadiums
2019 Cricket World Cup stadiums